Heinrich Bauer may refer to:
 Heinrich Bauer (revolutionary) (1813–?), German revolutionary, shoemaker
 Heinrich Bauer (politician) (1874–1927), Estonian politician